Édouard Baer (born 1 December 1966) is a French actor, director, screenwriter, film producer and radio personality.

In 2009, he participated in the French television programme Rendez-vous en terre inconnue.

Theatre

Filmography

Actor

Filmmaker

References

External links

1966 births
Living people
Male actors from Paris
French male film actors
French male stage actors
Cours Florent alumni
20th-century French male actors
21st-century French male actors
French male television actors
French film directors
French male screenwriters
French screenwriters
French film producers